The Battle of Bolchu was a critical battle in the Turkic Khaganate history in 711.

Background
In the 7th century, the First Turkic Khaganate was divided into two rival states. Both states were subsequently defeated and annexed by the Tang dynasty. However, both sections of the empire soon gained their independence. The eastern part was called Second Turkic Khaganate and the western part Turgesh (or more loosely Onoq, the ten tribes which were dominated by the Turgesh). According to old Turkic traditions, the eastern sections were considered as the main khaganate and the western sections were considered as the vassals of the eastern section. Thus Turgesh leaders were apprehensive of the Kutluk Khaganate and they sought alliances (like Yenisei Kirghiz and Tang dynasty) against the growing power of the east.

Early moves
Turgesh khagan Suoge (also called Soko) had given his brother Zhenu ülüş (fief). His brother however asked for more and fled to Kutluk Khaganate. Kapagan, the khagan of the Kutluk khaganate was occupied in the east (against Khitan people) and Suoge saw this as an opportunity to strike. The army of Turgesh and the allies was a large army. According to Bain Tsokto inscriptions its manpower was about 100,000. Probably this figure was exaggerated, but it was certainly more powerful than the Kapagan's army of 20,000. Moreover, the khatun (queen) was dead and the khagan was busy in burial services. He appointed Tonyukuk the chancellor as the commander. Kapagan’s son Inel, as well as his nephews Bilge (both future khagans) and Kul Tigin, were with Tonyukuk. According to historian Lev Gumilev, Kapagan was not sure about the victory and Tonyukuk was given orders for attrition warfare.

Battle
The vanguard units of the Tonyukuk’s army won a minor victory against Turgesh vanguard units. But this victory demoralized the commanders in the Tonyukuk army who learned about the strength of the Turgesh army. Tonyukuk however was determined and attacked the Turgesh army. The final clash was in Dzungaria, close to the Bolchu River (probably Bolchu River was the former name of the Urungu River, Xinjiang, China). After two days' fighting Tonyukuk defeated the Turgesh army. Both the Turgesh khagan Suoge and his brother Zhenu were executed. The other leaders of Onoq paid obedience and all western Turkestan fell under the Kutluk khaganate. According to Bain Tsokto inscriptions, Temir Kapig in Transoxania (now in Uzbekistan) was also captured.

Aftermath
Although Kapagan was able to unite all territory of the first Turkic Khaganate under his rule, Turkic rule in Transoxania was short. It was soon checked by the Arabs who were also conquering Transoxania from the south. Although Turkic prince Kül Tigin was able to save the Turkic army, Turkic hegemony diminished and Turgesh (now under Suluk) regained strength. In later years it was Suluk who fought against the invading Arabs.

References

Sources
 
 
 

Military history of the Göktürks
711
Bolchu
Bolchu